is a film director and screenwriter from Japan. He has often collaborated with Takahisa Zeze.

Career
Izuchi began making films while a student at Hosei University, winning an award at the Tokyo Student Film Festival.
He began writing screenplays for pink films while starting his own independent production company, Spiritual Movies. His 8mm directorial film Jesus in Nirvana was released commercially in theaters. His films have been introduced at Frankfurt's Nippon Connection film festival.

His works

As director
Jesus in Nirvana (Hyakunen no zesshō), 1998
Mole’s Festival (Mogura no matsuri), 2010 
Muddy Planet (Doro no wakusei),  2010

As screenwriter
Moon Child

See also
Haruhiko Arai
Kojin Karatani- who appears in a documentary film  'Left Alone' directed by Izuchi

References

External links

Izuchi Kishu- His profile in International Film Festival Rotterdam's webpage

Japanese screenwriters
Japanese film directors
Living people
1968 births